Philip Embury (Ballingrane, County Limerick, Ireland, 21 September 1729 – Camden Valley, New York, August 1775) was a Methodist preacher, a leader of one of the earliest Methodist congregations in the United States.

Biography
Embury's parents were members of the colony of Germans that emigrated from the Palatinate to Ireland early in the eighteenth century, and in which Wesley labored with great success. The colony had formed from Protestant Germans forced to abandon their farms on the Rhine due to French Catholic raids and a harsh winter.  In 1709 Queen Anne of England accepted the refugees, settling a group of families in Catholic Ireland to boost the Protestant presence.  Embury was educated at a school near Ballingrane, County Limerick, Ireland, and learned the carpenter's trade. He was converted on Christmas day, 1752, became a local preacher at Court-Matrix in 1758, and married Margaret Switzer that fall.

In 1760, due to rising rents and scarce land, he came to New York City and worked as a school teacher. In common with his fellow emigrants, he began to lose interest in religious matters, and did not preach in New York till 1766, when, moved by the reproaches of Barbara Heck, sometimes called the "foundress of American Methodism," he began to hold services first in his own house on Barrack Street, now Park Place, and then in a rigging loft on what is now William Street. The congregation thus formed was probably the first Methodist congregation in the United States, though it is a disputed question whether precedence should not be given to Robert Strawbridge, who began laboring in Maryland about this time.  Before this, he and his cousin Barbara Heck had worshiped along with other Irish Palatines at Trinity Lutheran Church where three of his children had been baptized.

The first Methodist church was built under Embury's charge in 1768, in association with Thomas Webb and others, on the site of the present John Street Church, and he himself worked on the building as a carpenter, and afterward preached there gratuitously. In 1769, preachers sent out by John Wesley arrived in New York City, and Embury went to work in the vicinity of Albany at Camden Valley, New York, where he continued to work at his trade during the week, and preached every Sunday. He organized among Irish emigrants at Ashgrove, near Camden Valley, the first Methodist society within the bounds of what became the flourishing and influential Troy Conference.

He died suddenly, in consequence of an accident in mowing, and was buried on a neighboring farm, but in 1832 his remains were removed to Ashgrove churchyard, and in 1866 to Woodland cemetery, Cambridge, New York, where in 1873 a monument to him was unveiled, with an address by Bishop Simpson.

Palatine Poem for the Departing Emigrants
From the article, Philip Embury comes a poem that many of the Palatine emigrants shared during their departure for the American Colonies:

Land where the bones of our fathers are sleeping,

Land where our dear ones and fond ones are weeping,

Land where the light of Jehovah is shining,

We leave thee repenting, but not with repining.

Land of our fathers, in grief we forsake thee,

Land of our friends, may Jehovah protect thee,

Land of the Church, may the light shine around thee,

Nor darkness, nor trouble, nor sorrow confound thee.

God is thy God; thou shalt walk in His brightness,

Gird thee with joy, let thy robes be of whiteness;

God is thy God!  Let the hills shout with gladness;

But ah!  We must leave thee- we leave thee in sadness.

Dark is our path o'er the dark rolling ocean;

Dark is our hearts; but the fire of devotion

Kindles within:  - and a far distant nation,

Shall learn from our lips the glad song of salvation.

Hail to the land of our toils and our sorrows!

Land of our rest!  –when a few more to-morrows,

Pass o'er our heads, we will seek our cold pillows,

And rest in our graves, far away o'er the billows.

Notes

References

Further reading
 Buckley, History of Methodism (Vol. I, New York 1898)

External links
 History of the Embury Heck Memorial Church, Ballingrane.
 
 (http://www.francisasburytriptych.com/ The Asbury Triptych Series is a trilogy about early Methodism. Philip Embury features in the opening book, Black Country.

1729 births
1775 deaths
Converts to Methodism
Clergy from County Limerick
American Methodist clergy
Irish emigrants to the United States (before 1923)
18th-century Irish clergy
Irish people of German descent